Chouihia is a town in Berkane Province, Oriental, Morocco. According to the 2004 census it has a population of 12,539.

References

Populated places in Berkane Province
Rural communes of Oriental (Morocco)